The Craven Shield and Young Shield were shortlived speedway end of season cup competitions in the United Kingdom governed by the Speedway Control Bureau (SCB), in conjunction with the British Speedway Promoters' Association (BSPA).

Craven Shield
Named in memory of Peter Craven (twice FIM World Champion), who was killed after a racing accident in 1963, it was held from 1997 until 2008. It was the end of season competition for top eight clubs in the league standings of the newly formed Elite League (the highest tier of speedway).

It was later a three-team tournament, with each team staging a leg on their own track and aggregate scores deciding the final placings. The format was changed in 2008 with three mini leagues of three teams with the best team overall of the three leagues progressing directly to the final. The semi final is contested by the other two league winners over two meetings home and away, with the winner progressing to the final.

Winners

Young Shield
Named in memory of Jack Young, an Australian who won two successive World Championships in 1951 and 1952, it was held from 1997 until 2010. It was the end of season competition for top eight clubs in the league standings of the re-formed Premier League (the second division/tier of speedway).

Winners

References

Speedway competitions in the United Kingdom